Michael Dobson (born 29 May 1986) is an Australian rugby league footballer who plays for the Wynnum Manly Seagulls in the Intrust Super Cup. In 2009, he won the prestigious Albert Goldthorpe Medal.

Background
Born in Junee, New South Wales, Dobson attended Erindale College and played his junior rugby league for the Junee Diesels, before being signed by the Canberra Raiders. In 2003 and 2004, Dobson played for the Australian Schoolboys team.

Professional playing career

Catalans Dragons
In 2006, the Canberra Raiders loaned Dobson to French club Catalans Dragons of Super League as a replacement for injured halfback Stacey Jones.

Wigan Warriors
After impressing at the Catalans Dragons, Dobson attracted the attention of several other Super League clubs, subsequently being signed by the Wigan Warriors in May 2006. There was some controversy over Dobson's signing for the Wigan Warriors. Under English law, Dobson was not permitted to play in England because he did not have a work permit. However, the Wigan Warriors managed to obtain a work permit for him, albeit in controversial circumstances. When Dobson signed for the Wigan Warriors, they were at the bottom of the Super League table, 6-points behind the nearest team and heading towards relegation. Dobson's impact at the Wigan Warriors helped the team survive relegation in the 2006 season.

In 2006, Dobson was statistically the best goal-kicker in the world with a success rate of 84%, equal to or better than St. Helens' Jamie Lyon, 81% and National Rugby League players Hazem El Masri, 84% and Andrew Johns, 80%.

Canberra Raiders
At the end of 2006, Dobson rejoined the Canberra Raiders. In 2007, Dobson was the club's leading point-scorer. In April 2008, Dobson signed a -year contract with the Hull Kingston Rovers effective immediately after being released from his Raiders contract. He was also linked to Super League clubs Hull F.C. and Harlequins RL.

Hull Kingston Rovers
In 2009, Dobson helped the Hull Kingston Rovers into fourth place in only their third Super League season. His individual performances saw him become the second winner of the Albert Goldthorpe Medal which is presented by Rugby Leaguer & League Express.

Dobson started the 2010 season with a try and 5 goals in a 30–12 win over Salford City Reds.

In 2013, Dobson played for the Exiles against England. On 27 June 2013, Dobson signed a 1-year contract with the Newcastle Knights starting in 2013 to return to the National Rugby League in Australia.

Newcastle Knights
Dobson started playing for the Knights in the 2014 NRL season. Dobson played for the Knights in the inaugural Auckland Nines series prior to the 2014 NRL season in February 2014. With an injury to the Newcastle Knights regular Jarrod Mullen, Dobson made his top-grade début for the Knights in their 30–8 defeat by Penrith Panthers. Dobson made 25 tackles in the game, the third highest on the day for the Knights. Dobson also played against his former club Canberra Raiders (in a 20–26 defeat), Melbourne Storm (in a 28–20 defeat), Cronulla-Sutherland Sharks (in a 30–0 victory), North Queensland Cowboys (in a 28–2 defeat) and Brisbane Broncos (in a 48–6 defeat).

Salford Red Devils
On 22 May 2014, it was reported that the Salford Red Devils of the Super League, had recruited Dobson for the 2015 season. In the match report following Salford's 4–25 defeat by the Wigan Warriors, it was reported "Salford will have re-inforcements next season with former Hull Kingston Rovers player Michael Dobson arriving from Australia after a far from happy time in the NRL."

On 16 June 2014, Dobson officially signed a 4-year contract with the Red Devils starting in 2015.

References

External links
Salford Red Devils profile
2014 Newcastle Knights profile
Michael Dobson Wigan Career Page on the Wigan RL Fansite.

1986 births
Living people
Australian rugby league players
Australian expatriate sportspeople in England
Australian expatriate sportspeople in France
Canberra Raiders players
Catalans Dragons players
Hull Kingston Rovers captains
Hull Kingston Rovers players
Newcastle Knights players
Rugby league five-eighths
Rugby league halfbacks
Rugby league players from Junee
Salford Red Devils captains
Salford Red Devils players
Wigan Warriors players